Yan Hong (born 6 October 1967) is a Chinese former swimmer who competed in the 1984 Summer Olympics.

References

1967 births
Living people
Chinese female freestyle swimmers
Chinese female backstroke swimmers
Chinese female medley swimmers
Olympic swimmers of China
Swimmers at the 1984 Summer Olympics
Swimmers at the 1986 Asian Games
Asian Games competitors for China
20th-century Chinese women